Wynonna & the Big Noise is the eighth studio album by country music singer Wynonna Judd. The album was released on February 12, 2016 via Curb Records. The album is Judd's first full-length studio album of original material since 2003's What the World Needs Now Is Love.

Track listing

Personnel 
 Wynonna Judd – vocals
 Peter King – keyboards 
 Justin Weaver – acoustic guitar, electric guitars 
 Tommy Hannum – pedal steel guitar
 Dow Tomlin – bass
 Cactus Moser – drums, percussion, backing vocals 
 Tami Olin – triangle
 Keith Sewell – fiddle, backing vocals 
 Leslie Richter – backing vocals

Charts
The album debuted at No. 14 on the Top Country Albums chart, selling 3,700 copies in the US in its first week.

References

2016 albums
Wynonna Judd albums
Curb Records albums